The Republican Guard is part of the French National Gendarmerie. It is responsible for special security duties in the Paris area and for providing guards of honour at official ceremonies of the French Republic.

Its missions include guarding important public buildings in Paris, such as the Élysée Palace (the residence of the President of the French Republic), the Hôtel Matignon (the residence of the Prime Minister of France), the Palais du Luxembourg (the Senate), the Palais Bourbon (the National Assembly) and the Palais de Justice, as well as keeping public order in Paris. Ceremonial and security services for the highest national personalities and important foreign guests, military ceremonies and guards of honour for fallen soldiers, support of other law enforcement forces with intervention teams, as well as staffing horseback patrol stations (particularly for the forests of the Île-de-France region) are also part of its duties.

The close physical protection of the President of the Republic is entrusted to the Security Group for the Presidency of the Republic (GSPR), a mixed police–gendarmerie unit that is not part of the Republican Guard. However, the Republican Guard does provide counter-sniper teams (Tireurs d'élite Gendarmerie or TEG) and intervention platoons (pelotons d'intervention). The Republican Guard also represents France at international events at home and abroad.

History

The Republican Guard is the heir of the various bodies that preceded it in the course of French and Parisian history and whose task was to honor and protect the high authorities of the State and the capital city – Gardes Françaises of the French kings, Consular and Imperial Guard of Napoleon, etc. Its name derives from the Municipal Guard of Paris, established on 12 Vendémiaire XI (October 4, 1802) by Napoleon Bonaparte. This unit distinguished itself in battles of historical significance, including Danzig and Friedland in 1807, Alcolea in 1808 and Burgos in 1812.

In 1813, the Municipal Guard was dissolved following the attempted coup of General Malet and replaced by the Imperial Gendarmerie of Paris and then, under the Restoration, the Royal Guard of Paris and the Royal Mounted Police of Paris. In 1830, it was recreated, but after the Revolution of 1848, it was removed  in favor of the Civic Guard (which proved to be a transient institution).

In June 1848, under the Second Republic, the Republican Guard of Paris was created, including an infantry regiment and a regiment of cavalry. On February 1, 1849, president Louis-Napoléon Bonaparte made the Guard a part of the National Gendarmerie. It received its insignia on July 14, 1880.

The Republican Guard didn't take part in World War I as a unit, but more than one third of its personnel were seconded to Army regiments for the duration of the conflict. As a consequence, its flag and banner are decorated with the Knight's Cross of the Legion of Honour. During World War II, it reported to the police headquarters and took the name of Guard of Paris. Part of its staff rallied to General de Gaulle, and the Guard was involved in fighting alongside the FFI during the liberation of Paris.

From 1947 to 1954, the Republican Guard took part in the Indochina War by sending three "Legions of March", which were mainly assigned to the training of allied indigenous troops and to the defense of certain places. The three legions, comprising a constant workforce of nearly 3,000 men, suffered heavy losses (more than 600 dead and 1,500 wounded during the conflict), which earned it the Croix de Guerre TOE. In 1954, the Republican Guard was renamed as the Mobile Gendarmerie and the Republican Guard of Paris became the Republican Guard. Both organizations were then and are still now part of the same branch in the French Gendarmerie. 

In 1978, President Valéry Giscard d'Estaing gave the Guard it new insignias on 11 November 1979 when the infantry regiment was split into the current two sparate regiments. Michèle Alliot-Marie, Minister of Defence, said in October 2002: "The Republican Guard has a popularity that transcends borders", and it contributes "to the splendour of the French military and France."

Missions

Ceremonial duties 

These ceremonial functions are performed mainly by the first infantry regiment, the cavalry regiment and occasionally by the second infantry regiment.

Detachments from the cavalry regiment reinforce the two infantry regiments in carrying out ceremonial and security duties in and around state buildings. These include the lining of both sides of the entry stairs of the Elysée or Matignon Palaces (and other buildings) by dismounted cavalry on special occasions. These Republican Guards belong to the Cavalry Regiment and not to the infantry units whose mission is to ensure the security of these palaces and of senior government figures. Certain ceremonial duties in the form of honour guards are performed during state visits to the Paris museums or the Opera, as well as during other ceremonies (for example at the French Academy).

Security missions 
Although the ceremonial duties attract more public attention, more than 80% of the missions assigned to the Garde are security missions. These include missions performed for the state such as protection of state buildings but also missions performed for the benefit of the population (for example patrols in the parks and streets).

Other missions 

Some guards are assigned to more specific missions:
 Security of diplomatic bags entering and leaving the Ministry for Foreign Affairs and the airports.
 Safety of sport events such as the Tour de France cyclist race by the motorcycle squadron.
 Reinforcement and support to the Departmental Gendarmerie
 Assistance and coopereration in foreign countries and especially in former French colonies.

Organization
The Republican Guard belongs to the French National Gendarmerie. It is made up of approximately 2,800 men and women (drawn from an overall body of 100,000 gendarmes). As a historically Parisian organization, the guards wear the armorial bearings of the city on their uniforms.

It consists of two infantry regiments (one includes a motorcycle squadron) and a horse cavalry regiment. It also has four musical formations, as well as display teams demonstrating prowess in horseback or motorcycle maneuvers. The Guard is commanded by a general de division (major general). It is headquartered in the Quartier des Célestins, Paris, built in 1895–1901, designed by the renowned French architect Jacques Hermant.

Cavalry regiment 

Headquartered in the Quartier des Célestins, and Quartier Carnot barracks the cavalry regiment is made up of approximately 480 gendarmes and civilians of whom a little more than 10% are women. It has approximately 550 horses (11% mares) and remains the last mounted regiment in the French armed forces.

The regiment is composed of:
 Three squadrons of cavalry (the first is based at Quartier des Célestins, in Paris, and two others based at Quartier Carnot, also in Paris at the fringe of Bois de Vincennes),
 Reserve squadron 
 A squadron hors rang (based at Les Célestins) and composed of:
 mounted band
 horse-shoeing (farriers),
 veterinary service.
 The training centre (centre d'instruction) at Quartier Goupil Saint-Germain-en-Laye
 Hunting Horns Platoon (Trompes de Chasse de la Garde)

This unit has a section of high level sportsmen, in particular Hubert Perring, dressage champion of France in 2005, and member of the French team for the World Equestrian Games of 2006.

The Guard Cavalry Regiment is twinned with the British Household Cavalry Mounted Regiment, the Italian Carabinieri Cavalry Regiment and the Senegalese Red Guard.

Special displays of the cavalry regiment 
Exhibition drill squads present five shows and reenactments:
le carrousel des lances (the lancer's carrousel);
la maison du Roy (the King's household cavalry);
la reprise des tandems (the tandem riders);
la reprise des douze (demonstration/lesson with 12 riders);
l’équipe de démonstration de sécurité publique (modern mounted police demonstration)

Infantry regiments 

The Republican Guard has two regiments of infantry:

 The first infantry regiment is composed of :
 Regimental HQ
 The Republican Guard Band and Bugles (military band and fanfare battery unit)
 Motorcycle squadron
 Compagnie de sécurité de la Présidence de la république (presidential palace security company)
 Three compagnies de sécurité et d'honneur (security and honor companies)
 the second infantry regiment is composed of :
 Regimental HQ
 Compagnie de sécurité de l'Hôtel Matignon (prime minister security company)
 Compagnie de sécurité des palais nationaux (CSPN) (national palaces security company; i.e., national assembly and senate)
 Four compagnies de sécurité et d'honneur (CSH)
 Auxiliary platoon

Each of the seven security and honor companies is composed of three regular sections (i.e., platoons) and one peloton d'intervention (intervention platoon). The regular sections perform ceremonial duties and guards. The intervention platoons provide special security in the government buildings and palaces protected by the Guard. They are also tasked with police missions in support of the Gendarmerie in the Paris area (home arrests, escorts etc.). One of the seven intervention platoons is permanently deployed on a rotational basis to either French Guiana in support of forces combating illegal gold mining or to another French oversea territory (typically Guadeloupe or Saint Martin).

Special displays of the infantry regiments 
 Bayonet drill team (quadrille des baïllonnettes; 1st régiment)
 The battery fanfare band
 The Napoleonic Drumline, made up of drummers wearing uniforms of the Napoleonic Wars 
 Emperor's grenadiers company, serving as a reenacting unit (2nd régiment)
 Motorcycle display teams

Band and Orchestra of the Republican Guard 

Depending on needs, the orchestra performs in three configurations:

 the concert band (80 musicians)
 the string orchestra (40 musicians), likely to be presented in configurations of 24 or 12 bows, or in string quartets
 Symphony orchestra (80 musicians)

It was founded in 1848 by Jean-Georges Paulus.

Armed Forces Choir 

This men's choir is composed of 46 professional singers. In spite of its name (Choir of the French army), it is part of the Guard and thus reports to the Gendarmerie and through the Ministers of the Armed Forces and Interior (owing to the military character of the service). The choir performs mainly during official ceremonies and commemorations but also during festivals and sport events of national and international importance. Since 2007, it has been led by a woman, Major Aurore Tillac, who serves as choir master and director.

Commanders of the Republican Guard 

 1813–1815: Colonel Bourgeois
 1815–1815: Colonel Colin
 1815–1819: Colonel Tassin
 1819–1820: Colonel Christophe de la Motte Guerry
 1820–1822: Colonel Tassin
 1822–1830: Colonel Foucaud de Malembert
 1830–1831: Colonel Girard
 1831–1839: Colonel Feisthamel
 1839–1843: Colonel Carrelet
 1843–1848: Colonel Lardenois
 1848–1849: Colonel Raymond
 1849–1849: Colonel Lanneau
 1849–1852: Colonel Gastu
 1852–1855: Colonel Tisserand
 1856–1858: Colonel Texier of the Pommeraye
 1859–1862: Colonel Faye
 1862–1868: Colonel Letellier-Blanchard
 1868–1870: Colonel Valentin
 1870–1873: General Valentin
 1873–1875: Colonel Allavene
 1875–1875: Colonel Grémelin
 1875–1877: Colonel Lambert
 1877–1881: Colonel Guillemois
 1881–1886: Colonel Azaïs
 1886–1889: Colonel Massol
 1889–1894: Colonel Mercier
 1894–1895: Colonel Risbourg
 1895–1897: Colonel De Christen
 1897–1899: Colonel Quincy
 1899–1902: Colonel Prevot
 1902–1903: Colonel Doutrelot
 1903–1904: Colonel Weick
 1904–1909: Colonel Bouchez
 1909–1910: Colonel Vayssière
 1910–1914: Colonel Klein
 1914–1917: Colonel Brody
 1917–1917: Colonel Lanty
 1917–1918: Colonel Brione
 1918–1922: Colonel Somprou
 1922–1924: Colonel Pacault
 1924–1926: Colonel Verstraete
 1926–1928: Colonel Miquel
 1928–1930: Colonel Moinier
 1930–1935: Colonel Gibaux
 1935–1936: Colonel Maze
 1936–1938: Colonel Durieux
 1938–1941: Colonel Ruel
 1941–1943: Colonel Martin
 1943–1944: Colonel Pellegrin
 1944–1944: Colonel Charollais
 1944–1944: Lt-Colonel FFI Chapoton
 1944–1944: Colonel Houllier
 1944–1945: Lt-Colonel Heurtel
 1945–1948: Colonel Gauduchon
 1948–1953: Colonel Nicolini
 1953–1957: Colonel Pelabon
 1957–1959: Colonel Dorin
 1959–1961: Colonel Bouchardon
 1961–1964: Colonel Gérard
 1964–1969: Brigadier general Dumont
 1969–1970: Colonel Chevrot
 1970–1976: Brigadier general Herlem
 1976–1980: Brigadier general Personnier
 1980–1984: Brigadier general de la Rochelambert
 1984–1986: Brigadier general Depardon
 1986–1988: Brigadier general Hérisson
 1988–1991: Brigadier general Kretz
 1991–1995: Brigadier general Lorant
 1995–1998: Brigadier general Villermain-Lecolier
 1998–2000: Brigadier general Puyou
 2000–2002: Brigadier general Prigent
 2002–2004: Brigadier general Schott
 2004–2007: Brigadier general Poupeau
 2007–2010: Major general Moulinié
 2010–2014: Major general Schneider 
 2014-2019: Major general Striebig
 2019-2023 onwards: Major general Bio-Farina
 2023 onwards: Brigadier general Thomas

Alliances 

  – Red Guard

Gallery

See also
 Bastille Day military parade
 Cadre Noir – an equestrian ceremonial unit of the French Army
 Cent-gardes Squadron
 Cuirassiers Regiment (Italy)
 Presidential Guard (disambiguation)
 Republican guard
 Salle des Traditions de la Garde Républicaine

References

External links 

 
Dans les coulisses de la Garde républicaine

Republican Guard
Guards regiments of France
Mounted police
Guards of honour
Military units and formations established in 1848